Dante Osorio Tiñga (born May 11, 1939) is a Filipino politician and jurist currently serving as the acting chairman of the Development Bank of the Philippines since 2022. He served as an associate justice of the Supreme Court of the Philippines from 2003 to 2009.

Profile 
In 1960, Tiñga obtained his law degree at the University of the East College of Law, where he also served as dean of the college from 1989 to 1993 and again from 2017 to 2018. Tiñga earned his Master of Laws degree from the University of California at Berkeley in 1970. From 1987 to 1998, Tiñga served as a three-term congressman representing the Taguig-Pateros district. From 2001 until his appointment to the Supreme Court, he was the first dean of the College of Law of the Polytechnic University of the Philippines. Justice Tiñga also maintained an extensive private practice prior to his elevation to the Court.

He is the father of Sigfrido Tiñga, who served as a Taguig city mayor and representative, and Rica Tiñga, a former Taguig councilor and 2013 mayoralty candidate.

Tiñga ran for mayor of Taguig in 1998 and 2010, but lost to Ricardo Papa and Lani Cayetano, respectively. Lost in a slim margin, he filed an electoral protest over the results of the 2010 election but it was later dismissed.

Tiñga sought a congressional comeback in the 2022 elections, this time as the first nominee of the newly-created Silbi Partylist. However, the partylist failed to secure at least one seat. 

On December 9, 2022, Tiñga was appointed as the acting chairman and member of the board of directors of the Development Bank of the Philippines.

References

External links 
Justice Dante O. Tinga (Official Supreme Court Webpage)

1939 births
Living people
20th-century Filipino lawyers
21st-century Filipino judges
University of the East alumni
Associate Justices of the Supreme Court of the Philippines
Members of the House of Representatives of the Philippines from Pateros–Taguig
People from Taguig
UC Berkeley School of Law alumni
Academic staff of Polytechnic University of the Philippines